Ilanjithara Melam is an assembly of percussion performance artists held at Ilanji (known as Bullet Wood tree Mimusops elengi) tree at the courtyard of the Vadakkunnathan Temple in Thrissur city during the Thrissur Pooram. It is considered one of the best platforms for traditional Kerala music and the largest assembly of percussion artistes in any other Poorams. The Melam in technical exactness and instrumental discipline are the best example of Pandi Melam.

The Melam
The Pandi Melam of Paramekkavu Bagavathi Temple is known as Ilanjithara Melam. The Melam begin at the Ilanjithara in the Vadakkunnathan Temple around 2.30 PM, and goes for around four continuous hours. The base of Pandi Melam is the Tripuda Thaalam. Correct number of instrumentalists participating in Melam is 222. But more than 250 instrumentalists assemble because of its prominence and various other reasons. 100 Chendas (In Edanthala and Valanthala categories), 75 Elathalams 21 Kombu and 21 Kurunkuzhal is the number of instruments in each category. There are 7 types of Melangal viz Panchari, Champa, Chempada, Adantha, Anchadatha, Druvam and Pandy. Adantha Thalam (14 Aksharas) is the Thalam performed in the Ilanjithara Melam.

Chiefs (Pramanis) of Ilanjithara Melam
Peruvanam Kuttan Marar is the current Chief of Ilanjithara Melam. He joined Paramekkavu Bagavathi Temple team in 1977 and later became its leader in 1999. He has been the Chief for 18 years and has been associated with Ilanjithara Melam for 35 years. Kuzhoor Narayana Marar, another veteran percussionist, was also part of the Paramekkavu team for 41 years. He was its Chief for 12 years.

Chiefs
 Pandaarathil Eachara Marar - 1940s
 Peruvanam Narayana Marar 
 Peruvanam Appu Marar - 1960s
 Thrippekkulam Achutha Marar 
 Pallavoor Appu Marar 
 Peruvanam Kuttan Marar (1999-)

References

Hindu festivals in Kerala
Culture of Thrissur
Festivals in Thrissur district
Folk festivals in India
Music festivals in India
March events
April events
May events